Harold Harrison may refer to:

 Harold Harrison (cricketer) (1885–1962), English cricketer for Yorkshire
 Harold Harrison (British Army officer) (1889–1940), England rugby union international
 Harold Harrison (Minnesota politician) (1872-1953), American businessman and politician
 Harold E. Harrison (1908–1989), researcher in pediatrics, see Harold E. Harrison and Helen C. Harrison

See also
Harry Harrison (disambiguation)